Edmund H. Deas House is a historic house located at 229 Avenue E in Darlington, Darlington County, South Carolina.

Description and history 
It was built about 1890, and is a one-story, frame Eastlake movement-influenced vernacular cottage. It has shiplap siding and a hip and gable roof with bracketed cornices and pedimented gables. It also has projecting polygonal bays with a single window in each face. It was the home of African-American politician Edmund H. Deas, who served as county chairman of the Republican Party in 1884 and 1888. He was also a South Carolina delegate to the Republican National Conventions of 1888, 1896, 1900, and 1908.

It was listed on the National Register of Historic Places on February 10, 1988.

References

African-American history of South Carolina
Houses on the National Register of Historic Places in South Carolina
Queen Anne architecture in South Carolina
Houses completed in 1890
Houses in Darlington County, South Carolina
National Register of Historic Places in Darlington County, South Carolina